Raylee Johnson (born June 1, 1970, in Chicago, Illinois) is a former American football defensive end in the National Football League. Johnson was drafted by the San Diego Chargers in the 1993 NFL Draft out of the university of Arkansas. Johnson played 10 of his 11 years for the Chargers. Johnson was signed by the Denver Broncos before the 2004 season. He was released from the Broncos on August 29, 2005.

1970 births
Living people
American football defensive ends
San Diego Chargers players
Denver Broncos players
Arkansas Razorbacks football players
Ed Block Courage Award recipients